The Lomwe (Lowe) language, Elomwe, also known as Western Makua, is the fourth-largest language in Mozambique. It belongs with Makua in the group of distinctive Bantu languages in the northern part of the country: The Makhuwa-using area proper (Nampula, etc.) is separated by a large Lomwe-speaking area from the related eChuwabo, although eMakhuwa neighbours eChuwabo in a more coastal zone. To the south, the rather more distantly related Sena (ChiSena) should be assigned to a group with Nyanja and Chewa, while the distinct group which includes Yao, Makonde and Mwera is found to the north. Apart from the regional variations found within eMakhuwa proper, eLomwe uses ch where tt appears in eMakhuwa orthography: for instance eMakhuwa mirette ("remedy") corresponds to eLomwe mirecce, eMakhuwa murrutthu ("dead body") to eLomwe miruchu, eMakhuwa otthapa ("joy") to eLomwe ochapa.

Unusual among Bantu languages is the infinitive of the verb with o- instead of the typically Bantu ku- prefix: omala (eMakhuwa) is "to finish", omeeela (also an eMakhuwa form) is "to share out". 

A mutually unintelligible form containing elements of Chewa, Malawian Lomwe, is spoken in Malawi. Maho (2009) separates out Ngulu (Mihavane) as a separate language, close to Malawi Lomwe.

References

Makua languages
Languages of Mozambique